Oleg Veretelnikov (Олег Веретелников; born 20 January 1972) is a retired Uzbekistani decathlete.

Achievements

External links

1972 births
Living people
Uzbekistani decathletes
Athletes (track and field) at the 1996 Summer Olympics
Athletes (track and field) at the 2000 Summer Olympics
Olympic athletes of Uzbekistan
Athletes (track and field) at the 1994 Asian Games
Athletes (track and field) at the 1998 Asian Games
Asian Games medalists in athletics (track and field)
Asian Games gold medalists for Uzbekistan
Asian Games silver medalists for Uzbekistan
Medalists at the 1994 Asian Games
Medalists at the 1998 Asian Games